Frederick V. McNair IV (born July 22, 1950) is an American former professional tennis player who reached the world No. 1 doubles ranking in 1976. That year, he teamed up with Sherwood Stewart to capture the men's doubles titles at French Open, the German Open and the Masters. McNair was also a mixed doubles runner-up at the French Open in 1981, partnering Betty Stöve. In 1978, he was a member of the U.S. team that won the Davis Cup. In nine years on the professional tour, McNair won 16 doubles titles. His career-high singles ranking was world No. 67.

History 
Before turning professional, McNair played tennis for the University of North Carolina, where he was a four-time All-American and an NCAA doubles finalist in 1973.

McNair comes from a tennis playing family. His grandfather, Frederick V. McNair Jr., and father, Fred III, both played in the U.S. Championships (now known as the US Open). Fred III and Fred IV formed a father-son doubles team which won six U.S. national father and son doubles championship titles.

Since retiring from the tennis tour, McNair has become the president of McNair & Company Inc., a family practice founded by his grandfather in 1931 which uses life insurance in estate planning and executive benefits arena. He won the United States Tennis Association 35-over tennis title in 1989 and 40-over title in 1995.

McNair's father Frederick V. McNair III, grandfather Frederick V. McNair Jr., and great-grandfather Frederick V. McNair Sr., all graduated from the United States Naval Academy. His uncle Jamshidi "Jim" Bakhtiar worked as a psychiatrist and he was a fullback/placekicker at the University of Virginia. Jim was selected by the Football Writers Association of America as a first-team back on its 1957 College Football All-America Team. His sister Lailee Bakhtiar, née McNair, is a writer and a niece of Laleh Bakhtiar, who was an author and psychologist. The McNair siblings' other aunt was also Lailee. His maternal cousin is journalist Davar Ardalan.  McNair is of Iranian descent on his maternal side.

Career finals

Doubles (16 titles, 22 runner-ups)

References

External links
 
 
Mid Atlantic Tennis Foundation Hall of Fame profile
McNair & Company Inc.

American male tennis players
French Open champions
North Carolina Tar Heels men's tennis players
People from Washington, D.C.
Tennis players from Washington, D.C.
1950 births
Living people
Grand Slam (tennis) champions in men's doubles
Universiade medalists in tennis
Universiade bronze medalists for the United States
Medalists at the 1970 Summer Universiade
American people of Iranian descent
Sportspeople of Iranian descent